Daylight is an unincorporated community in Warren County, Tennessee.

History
A post office called Daylight was established in 1882, and remained in operation until 1963. A first settler selected the name "Daylight" on account of its euphonic sound.

References

Unincorporated communities in Warren County, Tennessee
Unincorporated communities in Tennessee